{{DISPLAYTITLE:C13H20N4O3}}
The molecular formula C13H20N4O3 may refer to:

 Albifylline, a bio-active xanthine derivative
 Lisofylline, a synthetic small molecule with novel anti-inflammatory properties